Kazimierz Romuald Mijal (September 15, 1910 – January 28, 2010) was a Polish communist politician and dissident, best known for founding the illegal Communist Party of Poland (Mijal) in opposition to the Polish United Workers' Party (PUWP) in 1965. He was born in Wilków Pierwszy.

Biography
Born in to a poor peasant family, he Graduated from a Tradesmen's Association Commercial School in Warsaw. He was a sympathizer of the communist movement in Poland however did not join the Communist Party. After marrying the communist activist and painter Jadwiga Gniewkowska, Mijal became politically active during World War II and joined the Polish Workers' Party, collaborating with Paweł Finder, Marceli Nowotko and Bolesław Bierut.

After the end of the war and the creation of the Polish People's Republic Mijal held various positions in the party and the state. He served as Mayor of Łódź, chief of the Presidential Chancellery, chief of the Bureau of the Council of Ministers, Minister of Communal Economy, and director of the Investment Bank. He was a long-time member of the CC of the Polish Workers' Party and then the PUWP. Following Nikita Khrushchev's condemnation of former Soviet leader Joseph Stalin at the 20th Congress of the Communist Party of the Soviet Union in 1956, Mijal aligned with the anti-revisionist movement then led primarily by Mao Zedong. He condemned Władysław Gomułka, First Secretary of the Polish United Workers' Party over his siding with Khrushchev and was an important figure in the so-called Natolin faction of the party. He created various pamphlets condemned by the party as "dogmatic and Stalinist", and used a fake passport to leave for Albania, whose leader Enver Hoxha led the anti-revisionist movement along with Mao Zedong.

He founded a new communist party, the Communist Party of Poland (Mijal), declared himself Secretary General of the "Temporary Central Committee of the Communist Party of Poland" and took control of Radio Tirana's Polish wing. With the Sino-Albanian split in 1978, Mijal gave up on the party and secretly returned to Poland in 1983. He was arrested in 1984 for distributing pamphlets but was released after three months. He attempted to revive the Communist Party in 1997 but lacked backing.

In 2007 he received honorary membership to the Front Narodowo-Robotniczy. He has written for the Fatherland Weekly, a left-nationalist newspaper. Mijal was an opponent of the EU.

He died in January 2010 in Warsaw, Poland. He was buried on the grounds of Protestant Reformed Cemetery, Warsaw.

References
Kazimierz Mijal - Dogmatic Diehard or Political Adventurer?, Radio Free Europe Research, Poland, 26 June 1967
Kazimierz Mijal's obituary 

1910 births
2010 deaths
People from Grójec County
People from Warsaw Governorate
Polish Workers' Party politicians
Members of the Central Committee of the Polish United Workers' Party
Polish Maoists
Government ministers of Poland
Members of the State National Council
Members of the Polish Sejm 1947–1952
Members of the Polish Sejm 1952–1956
Anti-revisionists
Polish dissidents
Commanders of the Order of Polonia Restituta
Recipients of the Order of the Cross of Grunwald, 2nd class
Recipients of the Gold Cross of Merit (Poland)
Mayors of Łódź
Hoxhaists